The 19th Presidential Awards festival (Sinhala: 19 වැනි ජනාධිපති සම්මාන උලෙළ), presented by the Sri Lanka Film Corporation with the collaboration of the Presidential Secretariat and the Ministry of Parliamentary Reforms and Mass Media, was held on July 29, 1996, at the Nelum Pokuna Mahinda Rajapaksa Theatre, Colombo 07, Sri Lanka. His Excellency The President Maithripala Sirisena was the chief guest at the awards night.

Around 96 Awards were presented to 27 artists who excelled in 79 films in Sinhala cinema screened from 2016 to 2018 (Twenty five films screened in 2016, twenty six films screened in 2017 and twenty eight films in 2018). Meanwhile, 11 recipients won the Pioneer Awards, Swarnasinghe Awards and Vishwa Keerthi Awards. The Swarnasinghe Lifetime Award was presented by President to veteran artists Ravindra Randeniya, Nita Fernando and Sugathapala Senarath Yapa. Meanwhile, Anoma Janadari and film director Sanjeewa Pushpakumara received the Vishwa Keerthi Award from the President for their acting talent. Purogami Awards were won by Shanthi Abeysekera, Anton Gregory, K.D. Dayananda, Swarna Kahawita, Sunil Soma Peiris and Alexander Fernando.

2016 Awards

2017 Awards

2018 Awards

References

2019 film awards
Entertainment in Sri Lanka
Sri Lankan film awards